Kissing The Beehive is a 1997 crime novel written by the American author Jonathan Carroll.

Plot summary
Kissing The Beehive is about Sam Bayer who is an author. Due to lack of inspiration for a novel which he had already collected an advance, he visits Crance's view in New York for inspiration. On getting there, he gets involved in an unsolved mystery of a female teenager in the town. He joins his friend Frannie McCabe who is police chief of Cranes View.

Awards and reception
Kissing the Beehive was nominated for the British Fantasy Award in 1999.

References

1997 novels
American crime novels